Frank Gresley (1855–1936) was a British artist. He painted mainly landscapes, of which the best known are those of the River Trent at Swarkestone, Barrow upon Trent and  Ingleby, Derbyshire. His father, James Stephen Gresley, was an artist, and his two sons Harold and Cuthbert also became artists.

Gresley lived most of his life in Chellaston, Derbyshire. Some of his paintings were donated to Derby Museum and Art Gallery  by Alfred E. Goodey.

References

External links

Frank Gresley Invaluable. (contains thumbnail pictures of his paintings)

19th-century English painters
English male painters
20th-century English painters
Landscape artists
1855 births
1936 deaths
Collections of Derby Museum and Art Gallery
People from Chellaston
20th-century English male artists
19th-century English male artists